Kholegaun Khanigaun is a village development committee in Nuwakot District in the Bagmati Zone of central Nepal. At the time of the 1991 Nepal census, it had a population of 4824 people living in 938 individual households.

Notable people
Binda Pandey (1966-), politician and feminist.

References

External links
UN map of the municipalities of Nuwakot District

Populated places in Nuwakot District